Wu Zhiqiang (born 10 April 1994) is a Chinese sprinter. He represented his country in the 4 × 100 metres relay at the 2017 World Championships finishing fourth in the final.

International competitions

Personal bests

Outdoor
100 metres – 10.11 (+0.1 m/s, Chongqing 2021)
200 metres – 21.05 (+0.5 m/s, Jinhua 2019)
Indoor
60 metres – 6.63 (Chengdu 2021)
200 metres – 21.95 (Beijing 2015)

References

1994 births
Living people
Chinese male sprinters
World Athletics Championships athletes for China
Athletes (track and field) at the 2020 Summer Olympics
Olympic athletes of China
People from Tongliao
Runners from Inner Mongolia
Competitors at the 2013 Summer Universiade
Medalists at the 2020 Summer Olympics
Olympic bronze medalists for China
Olympic bronze medalists in athletics (track and field)